Ara-Kiret (Ara Khereete) is a rural locality (a selo) in Bichursky District, Republic of Buryatia, Russia. The population was 363 as of 2010. There are 2 streets.

Geography 
Ara-Kiret is located 14 km west of Bichura (the district's administrative centre) by road. Dunda-Kiret is the nearest rural locality.

References 

Rural localities in Bichursky District